Zunz is a Yiddish surname:

  (1874–1939), Belgian pharmacologist
 Sir Gerhard Jack Zunz (1923–2018), British civil engineer
 Leopold Zunz (Yom Tov Lipmann Tzuntz) (1794–1886), German Reform rabbi and writer, the founder of academic Judaic Studies (Wissenschaft des Judentums)
 Olivier Zunz (born 1946), social historian

Zuntz 
 Alexander Zuntz, signatory of Buttonwood Agreement
 Günther Zuntz (1902–1992), German-English classical philologist
 Heinrich Zuntz, founder of Odeon Records
 Leonie Zuntz (1908–1942), German Hittitologist
 Nathan Zuntz (1847–1920), German physiologist
 Rachel Zuntz (1787–1874), German businessperson

See also 
 Emma Zunz, short story by Jorge Luis Borges
 Zastań, a village in the Gmina Wolin, Kamień County, Poland
 Nyingchi Mainling Airport, an airport with ICAO code ZUNZ

Jewish surnames
Yiddish-language surnames